Lodderena minima, common name the minute liotia, is a species of minute sea snail, a marine gastropod mollusk in the family Skeneidae.

Description
The size of this minute shell varies between 0.5 mm and 1.1 mm. The translucent white shell has a planorbiform shape with a flat or slightly raised spire. The shell contains about three whorls with 1½ whorl in the protoconch. The shell is devoid of ornament, except the regular spiral groove. It has, however, a remarkably thickened, smooth varix round the circular aperture, and a granularly margined, wide umbilicus.

Distribution
This marine species is endemic to Australia and occurs off Queensland, southwards to Tasmania and South Australia.

References

 Iredale, T. (1924). Results from Roy Bell's molluscan collections. Proceedings of the Linnean Society of New South Wales. 49 (3): 179-279, pl. 33-36.
 Cotton, B. C. (1959). South Australian Mollusca. Archaeogastropoda. Adelaide. : W.L. Hawes. 449 pp., 1 pl.
 Jenkins, B.W. (1984). Southern Australian Liotiidae. Australian Shell News. 47 : 3-5

External links
 To World Register of Marine Species
 
 Seashells of New South Wales: Lodderena minima

minima
Gastropods of Australia
Gastropods described in 1878